Kinbane Castle (Caisleán Ceinn Bán, White Head Castle, Kenbane Castle) is located in County Antrim, Northern Ireland, on a headland between Ballycastle and Ballintoy. The name comes from the Irish for "white head", referring to the limestone of the promontory. Nowadays, the castle is largely destroyed. Kinbane Castle is a State Care Historic Monument sited in the townland of Cregganboy, in Moyle District Council area, at grid ref: D0876 4383. The area surrounding Kinbane Castle is a Scheduled Historic Monument, grid ref: D0879 4381. The site also has views of Rathlin Island and Dunagregor Iron Age fort.

History

In 1547, a two-storey castle was built at the headland by Colla MacDonnell. The castle was damaged and partly destroyed due to English sieges under Sir James Croft in the 1550s. Rebuilt afterwards, Colla MacDonnell died at the castle in 1558, and his son Gillaspick MacDonnell subsequently inherited it.

The hollow below the castle known as Lag na Sassenach (Hollow of the English) and it was allegedly during the 16th century that a garrison of English soldiers sieging the castle were surrounded and killed.

Sorley Boy MacDonnell, brother of Colla, later acquired the castle when trading property with Gillaspick. He later handed it to the MacAlisters because of their loyalty. The castle remained in the descendants of the MacAlisters of Kenbane until the 18th century.

See also 
Castles in Northern Ireland

References 

Castles in County Antrim
Clan MacAlister
Ruined castles in Northern Ireland
Tower houses in Northern Ireland